Al rojo vivo (English title: Red Hot) is a Mexican telenovela directed by Alfredo Saldaña and produced by Ernesto Alonso for Televisa in 1980.

Alma Muriel and Frank Moro starred as protagonists, while Silvia Pasquel, Miguel Palmer and Carlos Ancira starred as main antagonists.

Cast 
Alma Muriel as Liliana
Frank Moro as Jorge
Silvia Pasquel as Tina Segovia
Miguel Palmer as Alfredo Álvarez
Carlos Ancira as Francisco
Victoria Ruffo as Pilar Álvarez
Napoleón as Benito
Aarón Hernán as Julio Segovia
Gloria Marín as Margarita
Leticia Perdigón as Emilia
Emilia Carranza as Laura
Malena Doria as Adelaida
Ignacio Rubiell as Nacho
Álvaro Dávila as Álvaro
Roberto Antúnez as Filiberto
Antonio Valencia
Ada Carrasco
Gustavo del Castillo
Héctor Flores
Antonio Miguel

References

External links

Mexican telenovelas
1980 telenovelas
Televisa telenovelas
Spanish-language telenovelas
1980 Mexican television series debuts
1981 Mexican television series endings